Neurocalyx calycinus is a shrub native to India and Sri Lanka. It is found in evergreen forests and wet, tropical habitats.

Description
It has different classifications.

It is a wild ornamental plant classified under the tribe Ophiorrhizeae.

References

Ophiorrhizeae
Flora of India (region)
Flora of Sri Lanka